Star Lake is an unincorporated community located in Vilas County, Wisconsin, United States. Star Lake is located on the northeast shore of Star Lake northwest of Eagle River.  It is one of two unincorporated communities in the town of Plum Lake, the other being Sayner, Wisconsin. Star Lake has a post office, which was downgraded to a Community Post Office  on February 8, 1997.

References

External links
Sayner-Star Lake Chamber of Commerce
www.starlake.org - A web site devoted to the history, geography, and ecology of Star Lake, Wisconsin.

Unincorporated communities in Vilas County, Wisconsin
Unincorporated communities in Wisconsin